Verkana may refer to:

 Hyrcania: a Greek calque for the ancient Iranian country Verkâna, which occupied an area similar to
 Mazandaran Province in modern Iran.

See also
 Gorgan: an Iranian city in the same area with a similar etymology.